Tremont is a microarchitecture for low-power Atom, Celeron and Pentium Silver branded processors used in systems on a chip (SoCs) made by Intel. It is the successor to Goldmont Plus. Intel officially launched Elkhart Lake platform with 10 nm Tremont core on September 23, 2020. Intel officially launched Jasper Lake platform with 10 nm Tremont core on January 11, 2021.

Design
Tremont is the third generation out-of-order low-power Atom microarchitecture designed for the entry level desktop and notebook computers. Tremont is built on the 10 nm manufacturing process and supports up to 24 cores. It includes the Intel Gen11 graphics architecture from Ice Lake.
 
Tremont microarchitecture provides the following enhancements over Goldmont Plus:

 Enhanced branch prediction unit.
 Increased capacity with improved path-based conditional and indirect prediction.
 New committed return stack buffer.
 Novel clustered 6-wide out-of-order front-end fetch and decode pipeline.
 Banked ICache with dual 16B reads.
 Two 3-wide decode clusters enabling up to 6 instructions per cycle.
 Deeper back-end out-of-order windows.
 32 KB data cache.
 Larger load and store buffers.
 Dual generic load and store execution pipes capable of 2 loads, 2 stores, or 1 load and 1 store per cycle.
 Dedicated integer and vector integer/floating point store data ports.
 New and improved cryptography.
 New Galois-field instructions (GFNI).
 Dual AES units.
 Enhanced SHA-NI implementation.
 Faster PCLMULQDQ.
 Support for user level low-power and low-latency spin-loop instructions UMWAIT/UMONITOR and TPAUSE.

Technology

 10 nm manufacturing process
 SoC (System on a chip) architecture
 3D tri-gate transistors
 32 KB L1 data cache, up from 24 KB in Goldmont Plus
 1.5 MB - 4.5 MB shared L2 cache per 4-core cluster, up from 4 MB in Goldmont Plus
 4 MB shared L3 cache
 Gen 11 GPU with DirectX 12, OpenGL 4.6, Vulkan 1.3,  OpenGL ES 3.2 and OpenCL 3.0 support.
 10 W thermal design power (TDP) desktop processors
  6 W TDP mobile processors

List of Tremont processors

Mobile processors (Jasper Lake)
List of mobile processors as follows:

Mobile processors (Lakefield)

Pentacore Lakefield CPU consists of 1 "big" Sunny Cove core and 4 "little" Tremont cores. AVX support on Sunny Cove (still physically present) is disabled to match Tremont core.

Server processors (Parker Ridge)

Processors for base transceiver stations (Snow Ridge)

Source: Intel Atom® Processor P Series Product Specifications

Embedded processors (Elkhart Lake)
List of embedded processors as follows:

See also
List of Intel CPU microarchitectures
List of Intel Pentium microprocessors
List of Intel Celeron microprocessors
List of Intel Atom microprocessors
Atom (system on chip)

Notes

References

Intel x86 microprocessors
Intel microarchitectures
X86 microarchitectures